Margret Kunihira (born 9 September 2004), also spelled Margaret Kunihira, is a Ugandan footballer who plays as a winger for FUFA Women Super League club Kampala Queens FC and the Uganda women's national team.

Early life
Kunihira belongs to the Toro people.

Club career
Kunihira has played for Kawempe Muslim Ladies FC and Kampala Queens in Uganda.

International career
Kunihira capped for Uganda at senior level during the 2022 Africa Women Cup of Nations qualification.

References

External links

2004 births
Living people
Ugandan women's footballers
Women's association football wingers
Uganda women's international footballers
Toro people
21st-century Ugandan women